Mona Saudi (1 October 1945 – 16 February 2022) was a Jordanian sculptor, publisher, and art activist.

Life and career
Mona Saudi was born in Amman, Jordan. She grew up in a neighbourhood that was metres away from the Nymphaeum (ancient Roman public baths) and this was her playground. The proximity to a historic site gave her a profound respect for Jordan's ancient art heritage, as well as providing her with a source of inspiration for her sculptures.

As a teenager, growing up in Amman, she knew that she wanted to move to Beirut, the then centre of the Arab arts scene, and become a full time artist. At the age of 17 years, she ran away from home, taking a taxi to Beirut.  In an interview with the Gulf News, she explained that she left home without her father's permission because in her family, women were banned from attending university.

In Beirut, she met influential artists, poets and intellectuals, including Adonis, Paul Guiragossian and Michel Basbous, and became part of their social circle. She held her first exhibition in a Beirut cafe, and from this raised sufficient funds to purchase a ticket to Paris.

She enrolled at the École nationale supérieure des Beaux-Arts in Paris, and graduated in 1973. In Paris, she fell in love with stone as a medium for her sculpture and had been using it ever since.

Saudi died on 16 February 2022, at the age of 76.

Work
Saudi mainly sculpts in stone. She used stones from around the world to create her sculptures. Outside of her country, Saudi was one of the best known Jordanian artists. Her subject matter explored themes of growth and creation.

Select list of sculptures
 Mother / Earth, 1965
 In Time of War: Children Testify, 1970
 Growth, Jordanian jade, c. 2002
 The Seed, 2007

Selected solo exhibitions
Poetry and Form, Sharjah Art Museum, 2018
Poetry in Stone, UAE, 2015
Al-Balkaa Art Gallery, Fuheis, Jordan, 1992
Gallery 50 x 70, Beirut, Lebanon, 1992
Al-Salmieh Gallery, Kuwait City, Kuwait, 1985
Alia Art Gallery, Amman, Jordan, 1983
Galerie Épreuve d'Artiste, Beirut, 1982
Galerie Elissar, Beirut, 1981
Galerie Contemporain, Beirut, 1975
Gallery One, Beirut, 1973
Galerie Vercamer, Paris, 1971

Selected group exhibitions
Forces of Change: Artists of the Arab World, 1994
The National Museum of Women in the Arts, Washington, DC, 1994
Atelier Art Public, Paris, 1993
Jordanian Contemporary Art Ontario, Canada, 1991
Arab Contemporary Art, Paris, 1987
Arab Contemporary Art, London, 1983

See also
 Jordanian art

References

Bibliography

External links

 Official website

1945 births
2022 deaths
20th-century publishers (people)
20th-century women artists
21st-century women artists
Jordanian artists
Jordanian women sculptors
Jordanian activists
Jordanian women activists
People from Amman
École des Beaux-Arts alumni